Aikio is a Sami-language surname. Notable people with the surname include:

 Pekka Aikio (born 1944), Sami politician
 Inger-Mari Aikio-Arianaick (born 1961), Sami poet
 Ante Aikio (born 1977), Finnish linguist of Sami origin
 Tiina Sanila-Aikio (born 1983), Sami singer, teacher, and politician

See also
 Aiko

Sami-language surnames